In the field of zoology, a spadix (plural spadices) is a secondary sexual organ found in some cephalopods and hydrozoans. In the genus Nautilus, the spadix is a composite erectile organ in the male located in the oral region which is composed of four highly modified tentacles and which is paired with a somewhat smaller antispadix that is also composed of four tentacles. The spadix is normally a concealed organ but quickly becomes distended upon the animal's death. The exact function of the spadix and antispadix in Nautilus is not yet known.

See also
Spadix (botany)

References

Cephalopod zootomy
Sex organs